The 1985 Virginia Slims of San Diego was a women's tennis tournament played on outdoor hard courts at the San Diego Hilton Beach & Tennis Resort in San Diego, California in the United States that was part of the 1985 Virginia Slims World Championship Series. It was the seventh edition of the tournament and was held from April 22 through April 28, 1985. Unseeded Annabel Croft won the singles title.

Finals

Singles
 Annabel Croft defeated  Wendy Turnbull 6–0, 7–6(7–5)
 It was Croft's only singles title of her career.

Doubles
 Candy Reynolds /  Wendy Turnbull defeated  Rosalyn Fairbank /  Susan Leo 6–4, 6–0

References

External links
 Tournmanent draws

Ginny of San Diego
Southern California Open
Virg
Virg